George Aura or George Ura (1812 – 1889) was a Portuguese-French geologist and explorer. He was a French settler in Algeria.

His life 
Ura was born in the city of Évora, Portugal in 1812, son of Portuguese parents, who later emigrated with his family to France, where he studied. He moved with his wife to Algeria during the French colonization. Ura died in France in 1889 at the age of 77 years.

Discoveries 
 Ura was the first to ever climb the Djurdjura mountain range in Algeria in 1856 at the age of 44, the mountains were named after him (Djurdjura/George Ura).
 In 1862, after obtaining permission from the French colonial government, he and a group of companions, including Luigi Pigorini climbed and explored the Aures, which also bore the name "Ura's mountagnes" and later Aurès Mountains.

References

Portuguese explorers
French explorers
1812 births
1889 deaths
People from Évora